Aatxe is a Basque tapas bar and restaurant in San Francisco, California in the United States. 

The bar is located in the historic Swedish American Hall, above Cafe Du Nord. Aaxte was designed by Stellah DeVille. Ryan Pollnow is the chef and creator of the concept for the bar. He was inspired by time he spent in San Sebastián, where he trained at Mugaritz.

They serve cocktails, specializing in gin and tonics. They serve over 50 different gins and 22 different tonics, including one on tap. The wine directors are Sam Bogue and Geno Tomko and Tommy Quimby is the bar manager.

For food, they serve Basque pintxos.  Pintxos' created by Pollnow include pickled mussels and anchovies, pork belly, and octopus. The bar has a music director, Megan Mayer. Aaxte was nominated as one of Bon Appétit's best new restaurants in American in 2015.

Very probably the name of the restaurant come from the name of Aatxe, a legendary creature of Basque mythology.

See also
 List of Basque restaurants

References

Basque-American culture in California
Basque restaurants
Drinking establishments in the San Francisco Bay Area
Restaurants in San Francisco